My Dream – Mio Visione is the debut studio album by Australian tenor, Mark Vincent. The album was released through Sony Music Australia on 2 July 2009 and peaked at number 2 on the ARIA Charts. The album was certified platinum.

Background and release
Mark Vincent auditioned for and won Australia's Got Talent in April 2009 after singing "Nessun Dorma". He was signed to Sony Music Australia following the win. Vincent’s talent was originally noticed by his late grandfather. As a boy, he used to sing along to opera albums, which then progressed to singing in his family’s Italian restaurant. Formal singing lessons soon followed, and he was seen performing at markets and charity balls. This album has been created under the expertise of music maestro Chong Lim, who has previously worked with John Farnham and Kylie Minogue.

Reviews
Adam Greenberg of AllMusic gave the album 3 out of 5 saying; 
"Fresh off a win in 'Australia's Got Talent', 15-year-old Mark Vincent took his operatic skills to a full album. Beyond the gimmick of a young virtuoso, though, the surprising part here is that Vincent has serious vocal abilities. The opening "Nessun Dorma" is a somewhat clichéd choice for opera to deliver to a mass audience, but he performs it well. As he moves through the album, the mix becomes a little more hit or miss. Vincent specializes in straightforward, stereotypical operatic forms—long notes, grandiose deliveries. In some cases the delivery of simpler English lyrics proves a downfall." adding "the album as a whole shows some incredible promise."

Track listing
Standard edition
 "Nessun Dorma" – 3:11	
 "Time to Say Goodbye" – 4:05	
 "Hallelujah" – 3:20
 "My Way" – 4:04
 "You Raise Me Up" – 4:02
 "Ave Maria" – 4:37
 "This Is the Moment" – 3:15
 "The Prayer" – 4:13
 "No Matter What" – 4:35
 "Unchained Melody" – 3:53

Platinum edition bonus tracks
 "Memory" – 4:11
 "The Impossible Dream" – 5:03
 "Mama" – 3:20
 "Lying in the Silence" – 4:14
 "Grown Up Christmas List" – 4:44
 "Advance Australia Fair" – 1:27

Charts
My Dream – Mio Visione debuted at number 5 for the w/c 13 July 2009, before peaking at number 2 three weeks later.

Weekly charts

Year-end charts

Certifications

Release history

References

External links
 Mark Vincent "My Dream - Mio Visione"

2009 debut albums
Mark Vincent albums
Sony Music Australia albums